Kenneth Karim Otigba (born 29 August 1992) is a Nigerian-born Hungarian footballer who last played for Vasas as a centre back. At international level, he has represented Hungary national team

Club career

Heerenveen
Otigba was born in Kaduna, Nigeria. He made his debut for SC Heerenveen on 16 December 2012 against Utrecht, coming on a 75th-minute substitute in a 3–1 loss.

On 30 August 2014, Otigba gave an assist to Mark Uth to beat FC Utrecht 3–1 in the 2014–15 Eredivisie. On 13 December 2014, Otigba gave an assist to Uth to beat NAC Breda 2–0 at the Rat Verlegh Stadion in Breda, Netherlands in the 2014–15 Eredivisie. On 7 January 2015, Otigba was chosen to be in the best team of December of the 2014–15 Eredivisie.

In August 2016, Otigba joined Kasımpaşa S.K. on loan for the 2016–17 with an option for Kasımpaşa to sign him permanently.

Ferencváros
On 5 June 2017, it was announced that an agreement was reached between SC Heerenveen and Ferencvárosi TC in connection with the signing of Otigba. By signing Otigba, Ferencváros ended a two-year long project since on 14 December 2015 it was announced that Ferencváros showed interest in signing him.

On 16 June 2020, he became champion with Ferencváros by beating Budapest Honvéd FC at the Hidegkuti Nándor Stadion on the 30th match day of the 2019–20 Nemzeti Bajnokság I season.

International career
Having represented Hungary U-21 as a youth player, he refused Pál Dárdai's invitation to represent Hungary at the adult team saying he would choose Nigeria instead. However, in 2018, he reconsidered himself and chose to play for the national team, making his debut in the friendly match against Kazakhstan.

Personal life
Otigba was born in Nigeria to a Hungarian mother and a Nigerian father, he moved to Hungary with his mother at age five and spent his childhood in Gyula.
Otigba said in an interview with the Hungarian Nemzeti Sport that "I'm a very lucky chap" when he was asked about his partner, Dutch singer and model Sanne Verbeek, a.k.a. Ayden. Verbeek participated in the X Factor in 2013.

Career statistics

References

External links
 
 Voetbal International profile 

1992 births
Sportspeople from Kaduna
Living people
Hungarian footballers
Hungary international footballers
Hungary youth international footballers
Nigerian footballers
Hungarian people of Nigerian descent
Hungarian expatriate footballers
Association football defenders
Eredivisie players
Süper Lig players
Nemzeti Bajnokság I players
Nemzeti Bajnokság II players
SC Heerenveen players
Kasımpaşa S.K. footballers
Ferencvárosi TC footballers
Vasas SC players
Expatriate footballers in the Netherlands
Expatriate footballers in Turkey
Hungarian expatriate sportspeople in the Netherlands
Hungarian expatriate sportspeople in Turkey